Tumpa Ghosh is an Indian television actress. She is mostly known for her shows Rangiye Diye Jao, Raage Anuraage, Agnijal and many others. Tumpa made her debut as lead actress in Bidhir Bidhan. Her first show with Zee Bangla was Raage Anuraage that was hugely popular and Tumpa was loved by audience for portraying double characters in Raage Anuraage.

Tumpa was last seen as Sreemoyee  in Nishir Daak on Colors Bangla. Now Tumpa will be working  in Teen Shaktir Aadhar-Trishul on Colors Bangla. Tumpa  has also worked on a movie Paan Supari, which premiered on Zee Bangla Cinema.

Television

Mahalaya

Movies

References 

Living people
21st-century Indian actresses
Bengali television actresses
Year of birth missing (living people)